Simon Aspelin and Julian Knowle were the defending champions, but lost in the second round to Igor Kunitsyn and Dmitry Tursunov.

Bob Bryan and Mike Bryan won in the final 7–6(7–5), 7–6(12–10), against Lukáš Dlouhý and Leander Paes.

Seeds

Draw

Finals

Top half

Section 1

Section 2

Bottom half

Section 3

Section 4

External links
Draw
2008 US Open – Men's draws and results at the International Tennis Federation

Men's Doubles
US Open (tennis) by year – Men's doubles